Vasyl Ivanovych Hubal (born 5 June 1967, in Lupcha, Khust Raion, Ukraine) is a Ukrainian politician. In 2014 to 2015, he was a leading figure in a political life of Zakarpattia.

Hubal was born near Khust. After serving in the Soviet Army, in 1988-1992 he worked for several factories around Khust i.e. Khust Factory Technological Equipment and a brick factory of the "Radyanska Ukrayina" kolkhoz (collective farm).

In 2006-2014 Hubal was a member of the Khust Raion council. In 2014-2015 he was a head of the Zakarpattia Oblast State Administration (Governor of Zakarpattia). When serving as a head of the Zakarpattia Oblast State Administration, Hubal was not able to prevent the 2015 Mukacheve incident, according to the parliamentary investigative committee. According to some sources, Hubal is being associated with the "Viktor Baloha clan".

References

External links
 dovidka.com.ua 

1967 births
Living people
People from Zakarpattia Oblast
Lviv Polytechnic alumni
People's Party (Ukraine) politicians
Governors of Zakarpattia Oblast